Ezekiel Morake (born 21 March 1996) is a Motswana footballer who currently plays for Jwaneng Galaxy.

References

1996 births
Living people
Botswana footballers
Botswana international footballers
Jwaneng Galaxy F.C. players
TS Galaxy F.C. players
Association football goalkeepers
Botswana expatriate footballers
Expatriate soccer players in South Africa
Botswana expatriate sportspeople in South Africa
National First Division players